Scutellastra natalensis is a species of sea snail, a true limpet, a marine gastropod mollusk in the family Patellidae, one of the families of true limpets.

Description

Distribution
This species occurs in KwaZulu-Natal, South Africa.

References

 Ridgway T.M., Branch G.M., Stewart B.A. (1999). Patella natalensis Krauss, 1848: re-description of an unrecognized limpet from the east coast of South Africa. Journal of Molluscan Studies 65:139–142.
 Ridgway, T.M., Stewart, B.A., Branch, G.M. & Hodgson, A.N. (1998). Morphological and genetic differentiation of Patella granularis (Gastropoda: Patellidae): recognition of two sibling species along the coast of southern Africa. Journal of Zoology, London. 245: 317–333
 Branch G., Griffiths C., Branch M. & Beckley L. (2016). Two Oceans, ed. 4. Cape Town: Struik Nature. 464 pp.

External links
 Krauss, F. (1848) Die Südafrikanischen Mollusken. Ein Beitrag zur Kenntniss der Mollusken des Kap- und Natallandes und zur Geographischen Verbreitung derselben mit Beschreibung und Abbildung der neuen Arten. Ebner and Seubert, Stuttgart, 140 pp., 6 pls.
 Herbert, D. G. & Warén, A. (1999). South African Mollusca described by Ferdinand Krauss: their current status and notes on type material housed in the Naturhistoriska Riksmuseet, Stockholm. Annals of the Natal Museum. 40: 205-243

Patellidae
Gastropods described in 1848
Taxa named by Christian Ferdinand Friedrich Krauss